"The Changeling" is a television play episode of the BBC One anthology television series Play of the Month, starring Stanley Baker and Helen Mirren in the lead roles. The episode is an adaptation of the play The Changeling (1622), a Jacobean tragedy by Thomas Middleton and William Rowley.

Plot
Beatrice-Joanna is betrothed to Lord Alonzo de Piraquo but is in love with Alsemero. She hires her father's manservant, De Flores, to kill Alonzo but after he has done so, she realises De Flores wants her as a reward.

Cast
 Helen Mirren as Beatrice-Joanna
 Malcolm Reynolds as Lord Alonzo de Piraquo
 Brian Cox as Alsemero
 Stanley Baker as De Flores

References

External links
 

1974 television plays
Play of the Month